Caviar Dreams is the debut extended play by Toronto rapper NorthSideBenji. Although the album was due to be released in July 2018, it was officially released on January 18, 2019. The album was supported by the singles "Confessions", and "Levels". It included production from producers Bricks Da Mane and Dan Berry among others.

Critical reception

Exclaim! gave the album a 8/10, stating that the album speaks to the determination of getting out of their current circumstances and living a life they may never have been able to dream of – a life where the term Caviar Dreams is no longer considered just an album title, but a reality worth living.

Notes
The song "Winner" was remixed by Play Dirty producer Bouncer which featured NorthSideBenji and Chip and was released on October 10, 2019.

The single "Levels" was certified gold by Music Canada on April 7, 2020.

Track listing
Credits adapted from Genius.

References

NorthSideBenji albums
2019 debut EPs
Hip hop EPs